The 2012–13 Women's FIH Hockey World League Round 2 was held from February to March 2013. A total of 22 teams competed in 4 events were part in this round of the tournament playing for 8 berths in the Semifinals, played in June 2013.

Qualification
8 teams ranked between 9th and 16th in the FIH World Rankings current at the time of seeking entries for the competition qualified automatically. As Canada and Ukraine withdrew from participating, only 13 teams qualified from Round 1. Additionally one nation that did not meet ranking criteria and was exempt from Round 1 hosted a Round 2 tournament. The following 22 teams, shown with final pre-tournament rankings, competed in this round of the tournament.

Cape Town
Cape Town, South Africa, 21–27 January 2013.

Results

Standings

Fixtures

New Delhi
New Delhi, India, 18–24 February 2013.

Results

Standings

Fixtures

Valencia
Valencia, Spain, 25 February–3 March 2013.

Results

Standings

Fixtures

1The match Belarus–Czech Republic was suspended due to heavy rain in the first half (1–0). The matchday was cancelled and moved a day back.

Rio de Janeiro
Rio de Janeiro, Brazil, 4–10 March 2013.

Results

Standings

Fixtures

Goalscorers

TTO
USA URU

References

External links
Official website (Cape Town)
Official website (New Delhi)
Official website (Valencia)
Official website (Rio de Janeiro)

Round 2